John Armstrong (1735 – c. 1784) was an American soldier and land speculator from Surry County, Province of North Carolina. During the American Revolutionary War he led units of the 2nd North Carolina Regiment of the Continental Line, advancing to the rank of lieutenant colonel. He was in command of the 2nd North Carolina regiment at the Battle of Eutaw Springs in September 1781.

After the war he became a land registrar for North Carolina and was active in converting war service patent rights into land grants. He originated the survey and plat layout that became the town of Clarksville, Tennessee.

He was the brother of Martin Armstrong, also Revolutionary War officer.

References 

1735 births
1784 deaths
People from Surry County, North Carolina
North Carolina militiamen in the American Revolution